NGC 6000 is a barred spiral galaxy located in the constellation Scorpius. It is designated as SB(s)bc in the galaxy morphological classification scheme and was discovered by John Herschel on 8 May 1834. The galaxy is approximately 103 million light-years away. It is the brightest of all the galaxies in the constellation Scorpius.
Two supernovae have been observed in this galaxy, namely 2007ch and 2010as, each having a mag. of about 17.2 and 15.5 respectively.

See also 
 List of NGC objects (5001–6000)
 List of NGC objects

References

External links 
 

56145
Barred spiral galaxies
Scorpius (constellation)
6000
Discoveries by John Herschel